Amt Spreenhagen is an Amt ("collective municipality") in the district of Oder-Spree, in Brandenburg, Germany. Its seat is in Spreenhagen.

The Amt Spreenhagen consists of the following municipalities:
Gosen-Neu Zittau
Rauen
Spreenhagen

Demography

References

Spreenhagen
Oder-Spree